Mark Holland  (born October 16, 1974) is a Canadian politician who serves as the current leader of the Government in the House of Commons. In the 2004 federal election he was elected to the House of Commons of Canada as a candidate of the Liberal Party in the Ontario riding of Ajax-Pickering.  Holland was subsequently re-elected in the 2006, 2008, and the 2015 federal elections. He was defeated in the 2011 election and became the director of health promotion and public affairs with the Heart and Stroke Foundation of Canada. He also served as the Heart and Stroke Foundation's executive director for the Ontario Mission and national director of children and youth, before returning to federal politics in 2015. In August 2018, he was promoted to the position of Chief Government Whip.

Background
Holland was born on October 16, 1974, in Pickering, Ontario. Holland majored in political science and history at the University of Toronto and graduated in 1996. He worked as an assistant to Member of Parliament Dan McTeague and at the Ontario Ministry of Citizenship and Immigration.  He also worked for the Royal Bank of Canada and the Canadian Imperial Bank of Commerce.

A lifelong resident of west Durham, Holland lives in Ajax.

Municipal politics
Holland served as a city councillor for the city of Pickering from 1997 to 2004, and as a councillor for the Regional Municipality of Durham from 2000 to 2004.

Holland created the Millennium Waterfront Committee in Pickering in 1998 and led the redevelopment of Pickering's waterfront.  He also founded the Region of Durham's Youth Partnership Initiative, the City of Pickering's Winterfest and was a member of the board of directors for Veridian Corporation.  Holland was also a member of the Durham Region Police Services Board, past vice-chair of both the Ajax-Pickering Social Development Council and the Ajax-Pickering Block Parent program and a past member of Durham Region's finance and administration committee.  He continues to be a member of the Durham West Arts Centre and was one of their founding members.

Federal politics
Holland is a member of the Liberal Party of Canada in the House of Commons of Canada, representing the riding of Ajax-Pickering from 2004 to 2011, and representing Ajax since 2015. He has served as vice-chair of the Public Accounts Committee, vice-chair of the Public Safety and National Security Committee, critic for Natural Resources, critic for Public Works and Procurement, critic for the Canada Border Services Agency, associate critic for Treasury Board, as a member of the Finance Committee, Industry Committee, Public Accounts Committee, Government Operations Committee and on the Cities and Communities Caucus.

In Parliament, Holland brought up a private members bill to advocate for the cause of lowering the voting age. The bill stipulated that 16- to 18-year-olds be allowed to vote in federal elections encouraged provincial and municipal jurisdictions to allow the same. He asked that an elections unit be taught in high schools before elections take place, to inform students on current events and issues at debate. By raising this interest in youth first, at the election they will make more informed choices. Furthermore, voting would take place in schools, raising voter turnout. In October 2006, Holland re-introduced as a private members bill a former Liberal government bill to reform the animal cruelty sections of the Criminal Code of Canada, which have changed little since 1892.

Holland has been named by The Globe and Mail as a member of the new 'Rat Pack' and was voted by the Hill Times as the most effective Opposition MP in Question Period and the 'Best Up-And-Comer' four times from 2006–2008. Conservative Minister Stockwell Day has referred to Holland as 'Perry Mason on Steroids' and 'the Caped Crusader' during their sometimes heated exchanges in the Public Safety and National Security meetings.  CTV called Holland "a one-man rat pack on a mission to change the hill".  Macleans has labelled Holland – 'Part Attack Dog – Part King Maker' for his going after Conservatives and for his role in the 2006 leadership campaign.

Aaron Wherry of Maclean's Magazine spoke of Holland saying "If you saw Kennedy in Montreal, Holland was inevitably not far behind. Already a favourite of some on Parliament Hill for his oratory skills and his impressive head of hair, Holland is a mere 32 years old – making him a potential leadership candidate for the next 30 years."

Holland supported Gerard Kennedy's leadership bid for the federal Liberal Party and was Kennedy's Ontario campaign chair. When Kennedy dropped off after the second ballot to support former Environment Minister Stéphane Dion, Holland went with him and was seen as key in building a bridge between the two camps.  Holland was the Ontario co-chair of Michael Ignatieff's 2008 leadership campaign.

On January 18, 2007, Holland was named the critic for Natural Resources in Dion's shadow cabinet.  He was subsequently named critic for Public Safety and National Security, a post he held until his defeat in 2011. In that capacity, he led the opposition criticism over handling of the G8 Summit, efforts to save the gun registry and opposition to the Conservative Party's crime agenda.  As a sharp and vocal critic of the government, the Conservatives dubbed him "Public Enemy Number 1" prior to the 2011 election, a fact Holland wore as "a badge of honour" citing other prominent Canadians the government targeted for disagreeing with their agenda. Holland was unseated by Chris Alexander, a former diplomat who ran as a Conservative. Holland has recently admitted that he attempted suicide after that defeat, saying ""I was told that I was toxic. The Conservatives hated me. No organization would hire me. My marriage failed. My space with my children was not in a good place and most particularly my passion — the thing I believed so ardently in ... the purpose of my life — was in ashes at my feet."

In 2015, Holland was nominated the Liberal candidate for the new riding of Ajax, essentially the southern portion of his old riding, thus positioning him for a rematch against sitting MP Chris Alexander.  As part of the Liberal surge in southern Ontario, he won back his seat with 56 percent of the vote, defeating Alexander by almost 12,000 votes.

In December 2015, Holland was announced as the parliamentary secretary to the Minister for Democratic Institutions. In January 2017, he was shifted to Public Safety and Emergency Preparedness.  In August 2018, he was promoted to the position of chief government whip, succeeding the previous whip, Member of Parliament for Honoré-Mercier Pablo Rodriguez.

Electoral record

References

External links
 How'd They Vote?: Mark Holland's voting history and quotes
 

1974 births
Living people
Members of the House of Commons of Canada from Ontario
Liberal Party of Canada MPs
University of Toronto alumni
People from Ajax, Ontario
People from Pickering, Ontario
Ontario municipal councillors
21st-century Canadian politicians
Members of the King's Privy Council for Canada